Pi Serpentis, Latinized from π Serpentis, is a solitary white-hued star in the constellation Serpens, located in its head, Serpens Caput. Based upon an annual parallax shift of 18.22 mas as seen from Earth, it is located around 179 light years from the Sun. It is visible to the naked eye with an apparent visual magnitude of 4.82.

This is an A-type main sequence star with a stellar classification of A3 V. It is about 320 million years old with a high rate of spin, measured at a 128 km/s projected rotational velocity. The star has an estimated 2.50 times the mass of the Sun and 2.27 times the Sun's radius. It is radiating 27 times the solar luminosity from its photosphere at an effective temperature of 7,566 K.

In 1992, an infrared excess was detected from this system at a wavelength of 60μm. The data suggests a dusty debris disk with a temperature of 45 K is orbiting 211 AU from the host star.

References

A-type main-sequence stars
Circumstellar disks
Serpens (constellation)
Serpentis, Pi
Serpentis, 44
143894
078554
5972
Durchmusterung objects